Karamu is a rural community in the Hastings District and Hawke's Bay Region of New Zealand's North Island. The area is on the eastern outskirts of Hastings city.

Karamu Estate covered the area in the 1870s. A dispute over the title was made moot by the challenging solicitor purchasing a large share in the estate. Part of the estate was sold in several farming allotments and residential sites in 1891. Further subdivisions occurred in 1919, and 1924. The remainder was subdivided in 1929.

Demographics

Karamu had a population of 1,311 at the 2018 New Zealand census, an increase of 93 people (7.6%) since the 2013 census, and an increase of 132 people (11.2%) since the 2006 census. There were 417 households, comprising 684 males and 627 females, giving a sex ratio of 1.09 males per female. The median age was 39.4 years (compared with 37.4 years nationally), with 270 people (20.6%) aged under 15 years, 249 (19.0%) aged 15 to 29, 633 (48.3%) aged 30 to 64, and 156 (11.9%) aged 65 or older.

Ethnicities were 69.8% European/Pākehā, 36.6% Māori, 6.6% Pacific peoples, 2.3% Asian, and 1.6% other ethnicities. People may identify with more than one ethnicity.

The percentage of people born overseas was 14.0, compared with 27.1% nationally.

Although some people chose not to answer the census's question about religious affiliation, 47.1% had no religion, 38.7% were Christian, 5.3% had Māori religious beliefs, 0.2% were Buddhist and 0.9% had other religions.

Of those at least 15 years old, 126 (12.1%) people had a bachelor's or higher degree, and 222 (21.3%) people had no formal qualifications. The median income was $32,100, compared with $31,800 nationally. 159 people (15.3%) earned over $70,000 compared to 17.2% nationally. The employment status of those at least 15 was that 615 (59.1%) people were employed full-time, 153 (14.7%) were part-time, and 30 (2.9%) were unemployed.

References

Hastings District
Populated places in the Hawke's Bay Region